Ground level may refer to:

 Earth's surface
 Storey of a building/structure on (level with) the ground; also called the "ground floor"
 Ground Level, Australian band
 "Ground Level", a song by Stereo MCs from the album Connected

See also
 
 
 Altitude above ground level, in aviation
 Ground (disambiguation)
 Ground-level ozone
 Ground-level power supply, in rapid transit
 Level (disambiguation)